Odontobutis is a genus of freshwater sleepers native to East Asia and Vietnam.

Species
The following species are recognized in this genus:

 Odontobutis haifengensis W. Chen, 1985
 Odontobutis hikimius Iwata & H. Sakai, 2002
 Odontobutis interrupta Iwata & S. R. Jeon, 1985
 Odontobutis obscura (Temminck & Schlegel, 1845) (dark sleeper)
 Odontobutis platycephala Iwata & S. R. Jeon, 1985
 Odontobutis potamophila (Günther, 1861)
 Odontobutis sinensis H. L. Wu, I. S. Chen & D. H. Chong, 2002
 Odontobutis yaluensis H. L. Wu, X. Q. Wu & Y. H. Xie, 1993

References

 
Odontobutidae